Omosarotes paradoxum is a species of beetle in the family Cerambycidae. It was described by Tippmann in 1955. It is known from Panama, Ecuador, and Peru.

References

Cyrtinini
Beetles described in 1955